Bo Melton (born May 18, 1999) is an American football wide receiver for the Green Bay Packers of the National Football League (NFL). He played college football at Rutgers, and was selected by the Seattle Seahawks in the seventh round of the 2022 NFL Draft.

Early life and high school
Melton grew up in Mays Landing, New Jersey and attended Cedar Creek High School. As a senior, Melton caught 51 receptions for 766 yards and nine touchdowns and also rushed for 451 yards and seven touchdowns. He was rated a four-star recruit and committed to play college football at Rutgers from over 30 scholarship offers, including Michigan, Ohio State, Oregon, Penn State, Virginia Tech, Wisconsin, Nebraska, Maryland, and Pitt.

College career
Melton played in 11 games as a freshman and had four receptions for 83 yards. He played in all 12 of Rutgers' games and caught 28 passes for 245 yards in his sophomore season. As a junior, Melton led the Scarlet Knights with 30 receptions and 427 receiving yards and caught two touchdown passes. In 2020, he again led the team with 47 catches and 638 receiving yards with six touchdown receptions and also rushed for two touchdowns and scored on a punt return. Melton decided to utilize the extra year of eligibility granted to college athletes who played in the 2020 season due to the coronavirus pandemic and return to Rutgers for a fifth season. He caught a career high 55 passes in his final season for 618 yards and three touchdowns in his final season. After the conclusion of his college career, Melton played in the 2022 Senior Bowl.

Professional career

Seattle Seahawks
Melton was drafted by the Seattle Seahawks in the seventh round, 229th overall, of the 2022 NFL Draft. He was waived on August 30, 2022 and signed to the practice squad the next day.

Green Bay Packers
On December 27, 2022, Melton was signed to the active roster of the Green Bay Packers.

Personal life
Melton is a Christian. Melton's father, Gary, played football at Rutgers and his mother, Vicky, played on the women's basketball team. His younger brother, Max, is currently a defensive back at Rutgers.

References

External links
Green Bay Packers bio
Rutgers Scarlet Knights bio

Living people
Players of American football from New Jersey
American football wide receivers
Rutgers Scarlet Knights football players
People from Hamilton Township, Atlantic County, New Jersey
Sportspeople from Atlantic County, New Jersey
1999 births
Seattle Seahawks players
Green Bay Packers players